Sângeorz-Băi (also spelled Sîngeorz-Băi, ; Hungarian: Oláhszentgyörgy) is a spa resort and town in the mountain region of Bistrița-Năsăud County in Transylvania, Romania. The town administers two villages, Cormaia (Kormája) and Valea Borcutului (Borpatak).

Geography
The town is situated on the northeastern edge of the Transylvanian Plateau, at the foot of the Rodna Mountains, partly within the Rodna Mountains National Park. It lies on the banks of the river Someșul Mare; the river Cormaia discharges into the Someșul Mare a short distance upstream. 

Sângeorz-Băi is located in the northern part of the county, on the border with Maramureș County. The town is traversed by national road  (part of European route E58), which joins Dej in Cluj County to Suceava.

Demographics

At the 2002 census, 97.8% of inhabitants were Romanians, 1.5% Roma and 0.5% Hungarians. 73.1% were Romanian Orthodox, 19.7% Pentecostal and 5.9% Greek-Catholic.

Education
The town is the home of the Solomon Haliță Theoretical High School.

Natives
Gabi Balint (b. 1963), footballer

References

Populated places in Bistrița-Năsăud County
Localities in Transylvania
Towns in Romania
Spa towns in Romania